Rick Leach and Jim Pugh were the defending champions but lost in the quarterfinals to Grant Connell and Glenn Michibata.

Pieter Aldrich and Danie Visser won in the final 7–6, 7–6 against Peter Doohan and Laurie Warder.

Seeds
The top four seeded teams received byes into the second round.

Draw

Final

Top half

Bottom half

External links
 1989 GTE U.S. Men's Hard Court Championships Doubles Draw

1989,Doubles
GTE U.S. Men's Hard Court Championships,Doubles